Stone Muzalimoja Mambo (born 25 March 1999) is a professional footballer who plays as midfielder for Championnat National club Orléans. Born in DR Congo, he holds both Congolese and French citizenship.

Career
Born in Kinshasa, DR Congo, Mambo joined Troyes youth academy in 2013, and signed his first professional contract on 24 June 2019. He made his professional debut with Troyes in a 2–1 Coupe de la Ligue loss to Lens on 13 August 2019.

On 20 July 2021, Mambo signed for Orléans.

References

External links
 
 

1999 births
Living people
Footballers from Kinshasa
Association football midfielders
Democratic Republic of the Congo footballers
French footballers
French sportspeople of Democratic Republic of the Congo descent
Democratic Republic of the Congo emigrants to France
Naturalized citizens of France
ES Troyes AC players
US Orléans players
Championnat National 3 players
Ligue 2 players
Championnat National players
Black French sportspeople